Fineotex Chemical Limited (ISO 9001:2015, ISO 14001:2015 and OHSAS 18001:2007 certified) is a speciality chemical company with its headquarters in Mumbai, India. Fineotex 1000 employees,is engaged in manufacturing of Speciality Chemicals and Enzymes for Textile and Garment Industry, Water Treatment Industry, Leather Industry, Construction Industry, Paint Industry Agrochemicals, Adhesives and others. The plants of Fineotex are located in Navi Mumbai, Ambernath, and Selangor in Malaysia.

Fineotex has been named as one of India's Top 1000 Companies by National Stock Exchange of India.

History  
Fineotex group was founded by Surendra Tibrewala in 1979. Later, in 2004, it was incorporated as a private limited company under the name of Fineotex Chemical Pvt Ltd in the State of Maharashtra. The company has been promoted by the members of the Tibrewala family. The company changed its name to Fineotex Chemical and went public with a listing on the Bombay Stock Exchange and the National Stock Exchange in 2007. Fineotex claims itself to be the only textile chemical company in India to be listed in the Indian stock market. Reliance Wealth holds a significant stake in Fineotex. In the year 2007, the company earned ISO 9001:2000 certificate from JAS-ANZ. In 2011, the company incorporated a Wholly Owned Subsidiary company in Malaysia named Fineotex Malaysia Limited. It also acquired a controlling stake in Malaysian manufacturing company Biotex. In the year 2014, the company was accredited with ISO 4001:2004 and OSHAS 8001:2007. In 2015, Fineotex was recognized as Star Export House by Directorate General of Foreign Trade, Ministry of Commerce and Industry. As of 2018, the company had 87 distributors across India. Its clients range across Textile and Garment Industry, Water Treatment Industry, Leather Industry, Construction Industry, Paint Industry Agrochemicals, Adhesives and others.

In the year 2020, Fineotex forayed into the home care and hygiene segment to serve the surge in its demand in the wake of the COVID-19 pandemic.

Arindam Choudhuri is the CEO since June 2021.

In July 2021, the company signed a global marketing and sales channel partnership deal with HealthGuard Australia.

In September, Fineotex announced its partnership with Eurodye-CTC, a textile chemical company based in Belgium for commercialization of specialty chemicals for the Indian market. It has inked an MOU with Synthetic & Art Silk Mills' Research Association (Sasmira) to set up its Research & Development centre at Worli Hill, Mumbai.

Management 
The key management team of FCL comprises the following members

Board of Directors 
Surendra Kumar Tibrewala - Chairman and Managing Director

Sanjay Tibrewala - Executive Director

Aarti Jhunjhunwala - Executive Director

Navin Mittal - Independent Director

Alok Dhanuka - Independent Director

CS Bindu Shah - Independent Director

Anand Patwardhan - Independent Director

Sunil Waghmare - Independent Director

Committees 
Audit Committee: Sanjay Tibrewala, Alok Dhanuka

Nomination and Remuneration Committee: Navin Mittal, Alok Dhanuka

Anti-sexual Harassment Committee: Surendra Kumar Tibrewala, Sanjay Tibrewala, Aarti Jhunjhunwala

CSR Committee: Surendra Kumar Tibrewala, Sanjay Tibrewala,

Stakeholder Relationship Committee: Sanjay Tibrewala, Alok Dhanuka

Administrative Committee: Surendra Kumar Tibrewala

Whistle-blower Committee: Surendra Kumar Tibrewala, Sanjay Tibrewala, Aarti Jhunjhunwala, Alok Dhanuka

Collaboration 
In 2011, Fineotex has entered into a partnership with a European founded specialty chemical manufacturing company, Biotex Malaysia. The management control is under the overseas partner.

Awards and recognition 

 In 2015, Fineotex got recognized as a Star Export House
 On 20 December 2017, Fineotex was awarded the Fastest Growing Manufacturer Chemical Company by Investors' Protection Fund (IPF) at Bombay Stock Exchange.
 In 2020, Fineotex was named as one of NSE's Top 1000 companies.

See also 

 Castrol India
 Clariant Chemicals
 Cochin Minerals and Rutile Limited

References

External links 

 
 Fineotex Chemical Ltd. on SEBI

Chemical companies based in Mumbai
Indian companies established in 1979
Chemical companies established in 1979
1979 establishments in Maharashtra
Companies listed on the National Stock Exchange of India
Companies listed on the Bombay Stock Exchange